Dimorphopalpa rutruncus is a species of moth of the family Tortricidae. It is found in Ecuador.

The wingspan is 18.5–20 mm. The ground colour of the forewings is pale brownish, slightly tinged with ferruginous and with indistinct darker dots especially in the terminal portion of the wing. The markings are browner than the ground colour. The hindwings are brownish.

Etymology
The species name refers to the form of the uncus and is derived from Latin rutrum (meaning spade or shovel).

References

Moths described in 2007
Euliini
Moths of South America
Taxa named by Józef Razowski